The Azadegan League (Lig-e Âzâdegân), also known as  League 1 (Lig-e Yek), is the second highest division of professional football in Iran. It was the top-level football league in Iran from its foundation in 1991 until 2001, when the Persian Gulf Pro League was established. Each year, the top finishing teams in the Azadegan League are promoted to the Persian Gulf Pro League, and the lowest finishing teams are relegated to League 2.

Since 2016, the league comprises 18 teams. The winner and the runner-up of the Azadegan League are automatically promoted to the Persian Gulf Pro League. The bottom three teams in the league are relegated to League 2. In the past, the format and number of teams were changed for various times. Persepolis is the most successful club with four titles.

History

Before 1970
Before the 1970s, Iran did not have an official national football league. Most clubs participated in championships of their city or province. In 1970, the Local League was created. The league included teams from all Iran in different qualifying tournaments. In 1972, the Takht Jamshid Cup was founded as the national league and included teams from all over the country.

1979 Revolution and 1980s
Due to the Islamic Revolution and the Iran–Iraq War, the Takht Jamshid Cup was dissolved and also the lower leagues were unorganized. Consequently, the people paid very little attention football at that time. In 1989 the Qods League was created as the national football league. Esteghlal were the first national champion since PAS Tehran in 1978. After the season the Qods League was not continued.

Establishment as First tier (1991–2001)

In 1991 the Azadegan League was formed as the top flight of Iranian football. The league was named as Azadegan League in honor of the Iranian prisoners of war who were released. Azadegan means the liberated in Persian. The league started with a format of 12 teams in the first season. In the 1992–93 Azadegan League season the league changed its format. 16 clubs participated in two groups of eight teams. PAS Tehran were the champions in both seasons.
Esteghlal relegated for the first time in their history in 1993. Before the start of the 1993–94 season, the league changed its format again. 14 teams participated in one group. Saipa won the Azadegan League title, sitting three points of runners-up Persepolis. Only one year later the league format was changed again. 24 clubs participated in two groups of 12 teams. Saipa defended their title in final against Esteghlal.

Prior to the start of the 1995–96 Azadegan League season, the league changed its format again. 16 teams participated in one group until 1999. Persepolis were the champions in 1995–96, 1996–97 and 1998–99, while Esteghlal became the champion in the 1997–98 season. In 1999 the league was reduced to 14 teams. Persepolis won the 1999–2000 Azadegan League season, sitting seven points clear of rival Esteghlal. The 2000–01 season was the last year of the Azadegan League as the top-level football league of Iran. Esteghlal became the champion in a league of 12 teams.

Continuance as Second tier (2001–)

After the Iran Pro League was established as the professional football league of Iran, Azadegan League was declared as the second-highest professional league in the Iranian football league system. Esteghlal Ahvaz won the 2001–02 Azadegan League season and promoted to Iran Pro League. Also Sanat Naft Abadan promoted to the Iran Pro League. 22 clubs participated in two groups of 11 teams including a final stage for the best four teams. The format was changed into a classic league of 16 teams for the next two seasons. Shamoushak Noshahr became the champion in 2002–03, while Saba Battery won the league title in the 2003–04 season.

Once more the league changed their format in 2004. Between the 2004–05 and 2007–08 Azadegan League season, 24 clubs played in two groups of 12 teams. After Shahid Ghandi winning the league in 2004–05, Mes Kerman became the champion in the 2005–06 season. Sanat Naft Abadan, the third-ranked team in 2004–05, criticized the Iranian Football Federation due to incidents in the final stage. In the 2006–07 Azadegan League season, Pegah and Shirin Faraz became the champions of the league, while Tractor failed once again for promotion. Also, Sanat Naft Abadan promoted automatically to the Persian Gulf Cup because of the 2004–05 Azadegan League promotion controversy.

After Payam Mashhad winning the title in the 2007–08 Azadegan League season, the number of teams was increased to 28 before the start of the 2008–09 season. They played in two groups of 14 teams until 2013. East Azerbaijan's famous club Tractor returned finally back to the Persian Gulf Cup by winning the 2008–09 season alongside Steel Azin. Shahrdari Tabriz and Naft Tehran were the champions in the 2009–10 season, before Damash winning the league in 2010–11. Paykan won the league title 2011–12, while Gostaresh and Esteghlal Khuzestan winning the league one year later. Although Shahrdari Tabriz could win their group, they had to relegate due to match-fixing.

The number of teams was reduced in the next two seasons. 26 clubs participated in 2013–14, while 24 teams played in the 2014–15 season. Padideh won the title in 2013–14 after a victory over Naft Masjed Soleyman in the league final. One season later, Foolad Novin could win the league after they beat Siah Jamegan in final. Due to the fact that Foolad Novin is the reserve team of Foolad Khuzestan, they could not promote to the Persian Gulf Pro League. Instead of Foolad Novin, Esteghlal Ahvaz was allowed to promote.

Since 2015

Before the start of the 2015–16 Azadegan League season, they returned to a classic league format. 20 clubs participated in 2015–16, before the number of teams were reduced to 18 one season later. Paykan won the 2015–16 season, sitting seven points clear of Machine Sazi. In 2017, Pars Jonoubi Jam promoted sensationally to the Persian Gulf Pro League after winning the 2016–17 Azadegan League. Also Sepidrood returned to the highest Iranian league after 25 years.

Like in the 2016–17 season, Nassaj was also involved in a dramatic season finish in the 2017–18 Azadegan League. At the last matchday, five teams had the chance to promoted. Naft Masjed Soleyman drew 2–2 with Mes Rafsanjan and won the league, while Nassaji defeated Rah Ahan 6–0 in Tehran's Takhti Stadium and became runners-up with 64 points thanks to a better goal difference than Khooneh be Khooneh.

Format
In the past, the format and number of teams were changed for various times. Since 2016, the league comprises 18 teams. Over the course of a season, which runs annually from July to the following May, each team plays twice against the others in the league, once at home and once away, resulting in each team competing in 34 games in total. Three points are awarded for a win, one for a draw and zero for a loss. The teams are ranked in the league table by points gained, then goal difference, then goals scored and then their head-to-head record for that season.

At the end of the season, the top two teams are promoted to the Persian Gulf Pro League and the bottom three teams are relegated to League 2. Furthermore, all teams in the Azadegan League can participate in the Hazfi Cup.

Logo

Clubs

Champions

Notes:1 Saba Qom was formerly known as Saba Battery  2 Shahid Ghandi Yazd was known as Tarbiat Yazd between 2006 and 2015  3 Rahian Kermanshah was formerly known as Shirin Faraz  4 Steel Azin was formerly known as Ekbatan  5 Tractor was formerly known as Tractor Sazi  6 Padideh was known as Shahr Khodrou between 2019 and 2021

All-time table

Notes:Only league matches, Play-offs are not included in the all-time table  
1 Nassaji Mazandaran was deducted three points in the 2012–13 season  
2 Aluminium Arak was formerly known as PAS Arak, Shensa Arak, Hamyari Arak and Shahrdari Arak  
3 Malavan was deducted six points in the 2018–19 season  
4 Payam Mashhad was deducted three points in the 2010–11 season  
5 Damash Gilan was formerly known as Esteghlal Rasht and Pegah Gilan  
6 Rayka Babol was formerly known as Khooneh be Khooneh

Attendances

Average league attendances

Notes:Matches with spectator bans are not included in average attendances

Highest attended season matches

Statistics

Top scorers

See also
 Football in Iran
 Iranian football league system
 Persian Gulf Pro League
 League 2
 League 3
 Hazfi Cup
 Iranian Super Cup

References

External links

Azadegan League Stats
Azadegan League Live Score, Player Statistics, Goal Scorers, Fixtures, Standing ... 
PFDC – Persian Football Dot Com
Iran Goals
Iran Sports Press
Pars Football
RSSSF database about Iranian league football.

 
2
Iran
Sports leagues established in 1991
Professional sports leagues in Iran